Misk may refer to:
Geography
 Misk Hills, a sandstone plateau in the East Midlands of England
 Misk'i, a mountain in the Bolivian Andes
Other
 MiSK Foundation, a non-profit organisation in Saudi Arabia
 Abu al-Misk Kafur, a ruler of Ikhshidid Egypt and Syria in the 10th century CE
 Fedwa Misk, Moroccan journalist and women's rights campaigner